Moradisaurus is an extinct genus of large captorhinid reptile, with a single species Moradisaurus grandis, known from the late Permian (Lopingian) aged Moradi Formation of Niger. It is the largest captorhinid known, estimated to have reached a snout-vent length of over two metres. Similar to other members of Moradisaurinae, it possessed multiple tooth rows, which is associated with a high-fiber herbivorous diet.

References 

Captorhinids